Junie Joseph is an American attorney and politician serving as a member of the Colorado House of Representatives for the 10th district. Elected in November 2022, she assumed office on January 9, 2023.

Early life and education 
Joseph was born in Port-au-Prince, Haiti, and moved with to her family to Florida at the age of 14. She earned a Bachelor of Arts degree in political science from the University of Florida and a Master of Arts in applied human rights from the University of York. She earned a Juris Doctor from the University of Colorado Law School.

Career 
Joseph worked in the Office of the United Nations High Commissioner for Human Rights and was a fellow at the United States Agency for International Development. Joseph was elected to the Boulder City Council in 2019 and the Colorado House of Representatives in November 2022.

References 

Living people
People from Port-au-Prince
American politicians of Haitian descent
University of Florida alumni
Alumni of the University of York
University of Colorado Law School alumni
Democratic Socialists of America politicians from Colorado
Women state legislators in Colorado
United Nations officials
People from Boulder, Colorado
Year of birth missing (living people)
Democratic Party members of the Colorado House of Representatives